Salutations from the Ghetto Nation is the third album by the American heavy metal band Warrior Soul, released in 1992. The album was remastered and re-released with bonus tracks on CD, MP3 and vinyl in 2009 by Escapi Music.

Critical reception

In 2005, Salutations from the Ghetto Nation was ranked number 381 in Rock Hard magazine's book of The 500 Greatest Rock & Metal Albums of All Time.

Track listing 
All songs written by Warrior Soul.

Personnel
 Kory Clarke – vocals, producer
 John Ricco – guitar
 Pete McClanahan – bass
 Mark Evans – drums

References

1992 albums
Geffen Records albums
Warrior Soul albums